The German Democratic Republic (GDR; German: Deutsche Demokratische Republik (DDR), commonly known in English as East Germany) was created as a socialist republic on 7 October 1949 and began to institute a government based on the government of the Soviet Union during the Stalin era. The equivalent of the Communist Party in East Germany was the Sozialistische Einheitspartei Deutschlands (Socialist Unity Party of Germany, SED), which along with other parties, was part of the National Front of Democratic Germany. It was created in 1946 through the merger of the Communist Party of Germany (KPD) and the Social Democratic Party of Germany (SPD) in the Soviet Occupation Zone of Germany. Following German reunification, the SED was renamed the Party of Democratic Socialism (PDS), which eventually merged with the West German Electoral Alternative for Labor and Social Justice to form the modern Left Party.

The other political parties ran under the joint slate of the National Front, controlled by the SED, for elections to the Volkskammer, the East German parliament.  The other parties were:

Christlich-Demokratische Union Deutschlands (Christian Democratic Union of Germany, CDU), merged with the West German CDU after reunification
Demokratische Bauernpartei Deutschlands (Democratic Farmers' Party of Germany, DBD), merged with the West German CDU after reunification
Liberal-Demokratische Partei Deutschlands (Liberal Democratic Party of Germany, LDPD), merged with the West German FDP after reunification
Nationaldemokratische Partei Deutschlands (National Democratic Party of Germany, NDPD), merged with the West German FDP after reunification

The purpose of the National Front was to give the impression that the GDR was a democracy governed by a broad-based coalition. In fact, all parties and mass organizations were subservient to the SED, and had to officially accept the SED's leading role as a condition of their existence. The other purpose was to catch parts of society that would ordinarily not be represented by the SED, a nominal workers party. For example, the CDU was directed to the large number Christians in the GDR, the NDPD was designed to catch former NSDAP members and so on. All of these parties were subservient to the SED, which per the GDRs constitution was the ruling party. All decisions, in practice, were made by the Politburo of the Central Committee of the SED, with the Central Committee of the SED and the Volkskammer rubber-stamping its decisions and the Council of Ministers of East Germany implementing them. In elections, voters only had the option of approving or rejecting a single "united list" of NF candidates. Elections were not secret and voters that rejected the National Front list or struck candidates from the list faced consequences. Two of the block parties were formerly independent (CDU and LDPD/LDP) and two others were established on the instigation of the SED (NDPD and DBD). 

The Volkskammer also included representatives from the mass organisations like the Free German Youth (Freie Deutsche Jugend or FDJ), or the Free German Trade Union Federation. In an attempt to include women in the political life in East Germany, there was even a Democratic Women's Federation of Germany with seats in the Volkskammer. The SED members on the list were always the majority because many candidates of the mass organizations were also SED members.

Non-parliamentary mass organizations which nevertheless played a key role in East German society included the German Gymnastics and Sports Association (Deutscher Turn- und Sportbund or DTSB) and People's Solidarity (Volkssolidarität, an organisation for the elderly). Another society of note was the Society for German-Soviet Friendship.

State Apparatus

State Council

Designated as an organ of the People's Chamber, the Council of State (Staatsrat der DDR) was largely a creation of Walter Ulbricht during his tenure as first secretary of the SED. After Ulbricht was forced to relinquish that position in 1971, the prestige and authority of the council correspondingly began to decline. However, although it was no longer the de facto supreme executive organ, Erich Honecker's assumption of the chairmanship of the Council of State in October 1976 represented a renewal of its importance. A similar move was made in the Soviet Union when Leonid Brezhnev became head of state. It is reasonable to assume that given East Germany's close adherence to Soviet practices, the increased invisibility of the Council of State since the late 1970s can be traced at least in part to parallel developments in the Soviet Union. Related to the takeover of the council's chairmanship by Honecker is the fact that after 1977 the number of individuals who were simultaneously members of the council and of the SED's Central Committee Secretariat increased.

In referring to the Council of State, the Constitution declared that it consisted of the chairman, deputy chairmen, members, and secretary; it did not specify the number of deputy chairmen and members. In 1987, under the chairmanship of Honecker, there were eight deputy chairmen and seventeen members. In addition to Honecker, two of the deputy chairmen, Horst Sindermann and Willi Stoph, were members of the Politbüro of the SED; Stoph was also chairman of the Council of Ministers, and Sindermann was president of the People's Chamber. Four of the deputy chairmen of the Council of State represented the other four political parties, as did four of its seventeen members. The day-to-day functions of the council were carried on by a staff consisting in 1987 of twenty offices and departments, all of which were headed by SED members. Despite the presence of non-SED members as deputy chairmen and members of the leadership group, SED control was guaranteed by the presence of Honecker, Stoph, Sindermann, and Egon Krenz, probably the four most powerful individuals in the country.

In the mid-1980s, the functions performed by the Council of State included representing the country abroad and ratifying and terminating international treaties; supporting local assemblies in the implementation of their economic and budgetary plans; administering electoral laws that govern the selection of local assemblies on the community, city, county, and district levels; discharging responsibilities for the maintenance of the country's defense with the assistance of the National Defense Council; and administering the activities of the Supreme Court and the Office of the Prosecutor General to ensure their actions were congruent with the Constitution and the civil law. In this area, the Council of State possessed additional responsibility for proclaiming amnesties and pardons.

Council of Ministers

The Council of Ministers (Ministerrat der DDR) was the government of East Germany and the highest organ of the state apparatus. Its position in the system of government and its functions and tasks were specified in the Constitution as amended in 1974 as well as in the "Law on the Council of Ministers of the German Democratic Republic" of October 1972. Whereas earlier the Council of Ministers had been described as the "executive organ of the People's Chamber," the 1972 statute defined the council as the "government." According to the new law, the Council of Ministers was to "carry out the decisions of the party of the working class on the basis of the laws and decisions of the People's Chamber." The Constitution (as amended in 1974) significantly expanded the functions of the Council of Ministers at the expense of the Council of State.

In 1987 the Council of Ministers consisted of a chairman, two first deputy chairmen, and nine deputy chairmen, all of whom constituted an inner circle called the Presidium of the Council of Ministers. The chairman of the Council of Ministers, Willi Stoph, was head of the government (prime minister). Stoph, a representative of the old guard and a Politbüro member since 1953, was again appointed council chairman in 1986. Unlike the nine deputy chairmen, the two first deputy chairmen, Politbüro members Werner Krolikowski and Alfred Neumann, generally had not been responsible for specific ministerial portfolios.

In 1987 four of the nine deputy chairmen represented the four non-SED political parties allowed to operate in East Germany. The four non-SED deputy chairmen were the minister of posts and telecommunications - Rudolf Schulze of the CDU; the minister of environmental protection and water management - Hans Reichelt of the DBD; the minister of justice - Hans-Joachim Heusinger of the LDPD; and the chairman of the State Contract Court - Manfred Flegel of the NDPD. The other five positions held by deputy chairman on the Presidium of the Council of Ministers were occupied by members of the Central Committee of the SED. Two of the appointees, Günther Kleiber and Gerhard Schürer, a candidate member, were also Politbüro members. Of the thirty-three regular members on the council, including both ministers and nonministers, nineteen were concurrently members of the Central Committee of the SED, and two were also Politbüro members. The latter were Erich Mielke, minister of state security, and Hans Joachim Böhme, minister of university and technical affairs.

According to the Constitution, all members of the Council of Ministers were formally elected to their posts by the People's Chamber for a five-year term. In fact, these decisions probably emanated from the Politbüro and the Central Committee of the SED. The Council of Ministers was required to work closely with the People's Chamber, and according to its administrative guidelines, the council was required to have all its legal drafts and decisions approved by the People's Chamber before they became law. In practice, the converse was true; the People's Chamber was obliged to approve those actions that were undertaken by the council and then routinely submitted to the legislature. Similarly, the People's Chamber was given the formal responsibility of selecting the membership of the council; in practice such personnel decisions were made by the Politbüro. The legislature was then expected to approve the selections.

The Council of Ministers was responsible for providing the People's Chamber with the major legal drafts and decisions that subsequently were to be promulgated by the parliament. The work style of the Council of Ministers was a collective one. It normally met on a weekly basis to discuss problems and plans put forward by individual ministers. It also confirmed decisions that were already made by the Presidium. The Presidium was of special importance because of its responsibility for handling the affairs of the council when the full body was not in session.

Specific functional responsibilities of the Council of Ministers included directing and planning the national economy; solving problems growing out of membership in the Council for Mutual Economic Assistance (Comecon—see Appendix B); coordinating and implementing social policy decisions that have been agreed upon with the support and concurrence of the Free German Trade Union Federation (Freier Deutscher Gewerkschaftsbund—FDGB); instructing and controlling subordinate levels of government, i.e., the councils at district, county, and community levels that implemented the laws and decisions of the central government; improving the functioning of the system of "democratic centralism" within the state apparatus; and carrying out the basic foreign policy principles of the socialist state.

Judiciary

Like all other aspects of the government administration of East Germany, the party was the ultimate decision maker in the operation of the legal system. The Constitution, however, provided for the right of citizens to a voice in the judicial process and the selection of judges, directly or through their elected representatives. It further provided for citizen participation in the administration of justice in an effort to deter crime. Basic guarantees for justice were said to derive from the "socialist society, the political power of the working people, and their state and legal system."

In fact, separation of powers did not exist in the East German system of government. Although the Constitution asserted the independence of the courts, it also subordinated the judiciary to the political authorities and their political goals.  Even the superficially democratic 1949 Constitution subordinated the judiciary, along with all other government organs, to the People's Chamber.  Judgeships were restricted to Communists of proven loyalty. The regime officially considered law and justice the tools for building a communist society and declared it the duty of all judicial and legal officers to serve this end. In effect, legal and judicial organs served as agencies for promoting official doctrine, and the careers of personnel in the system were dependent on their political ratings as determined by higher state and party officials.

At the top of East Germany's legal system was the Ministry of Justice, the Supreme Court, and the Office of the Prosecutor General. In 1987 the heads of these offices were, respectively, Hans-Joachim Heusinger (LDPD), Heinrich Toeplitz (CDU), and Josef Streit (SED). The Prosecutor General appointed prosecutors throughout East Germany, including those active in military courts; he could dismiss them, and they were "responsible to him and bound by his instructions." The Office of the Prosecutor General was also responsible for supervising "strict adherence to socialist legality and protecting citizens from violations of the law." The role of the Ministry of Justice, which was not mentioned in the Constitution, appeared to be largely formal and propagandistic.

The organs of justice were the Supreme Court, regional courts, district courts, and social courts. Military jurisdiction was exercised by the Supreme Court and military tribunals and courts. The specific areas of responsibility for each level of the court system are defined by law. Professional and lay judges of the courts are elected for five years by corresponding representative bodies, except district court judges, who were elected directly by the citizenry. They were subject to dismissal for malfeasance and for violations of law and the Constitution in the performance of their duties.

Under the Constitution, the Supreme Court, as the highest organ of the legal system, directed the jurisdiction of all lower courts and was charged with ensuring the uniform application of the law on all levels. The highest court not only had the right of extraordinary appeal as a measure of control over the lower courts but on occasion serves as a link in the chain of command by issuing general legal directives. According to Article 93 of the Constitution, the Supreme Court "directs the jurisdiction of the courts on the basis of the Constitution, the laws, and their statutory regulations. . . . It ensures a uniform application of the law by all courts." The directive function of the Supreme Court went far beyond that of supreme courts in Western systems, which as a rule do not give legally binding instructions to the lower courts concerning specific questions of law. The Supreme Court was responsible to the People's Chamber and, between the latter's sessions, to the Council of State. Internally, the organization of the high court consisted of an assembly, a presidium, and three functional administrative divisions known as collegiums for criminal justice, military justice, and civil, family, and labor law. The assembly, which was directed in its plenary sessions by the Supreme Court Presidium, consisted of fifteen directors of the district courts, the chairmen of the higher military courts, and all professional judges.

Each district court was presided over by a professional judge and two jurors in cases of original jurisdiction and by three professional judges in cases of appellate jurisdiction. The district courts had appellate jurisdiction in civil cases and original jurisdiction in major criminal cases such as economic crimes, murder, and crimes against the state.

The county court was the lowest level of the judiciary system, and each of the country's counties had at least one such court, which was presided over by a professional judge and two lay assessors. The majority of all criminal and civil cases were tried at this level; county courts had jurisdiction over cases not assigned elsewhere and civil cases involving only small amounts of property.

In addition to the regular law courts, East Germany also developed an extensive system of community and social courts (gesellschaftliche Gerichte), known also as "conflict or arbitration commissions" (Konflikt-und Schiedskommissionen). The first were formed in state-owned and private enterprises, health and educational institutions, offices, and social organizations. The second were established in residential areas, collective farms, and cooperatives of manual laborers, fishermen, and gardeners. Created to relieve the regular courts of their minor civil or criminal case loads, the jurisdiction of the courts applied to labor disputes, minor breaches of the peace, misdemeanors, infringements of the law, truancy, and conflicts in civil law. These courts were composed of lay jurors elected by their respective constituencies. Party officials at the community level generally influenced the nomination of jurors to the community courts and exercised considerable influence on the outcome of cases heard at this level.

Politicians of note in East Germany

Leaders and their key positions - see also Leaders of East Germany
Heinrich Rau Chairman of the German Economic Commission (predecessor of the East German government), (1948-1949)
Erich Honecker (General Secretary of the Socialist Unity Party (SED), 1971–89; Chairman of the Council of State, 1976–89)
Walter Ulbricht (General Secretary of the SED, 1950–71; Chairman of the Council of State, 1960–73)
Wilhelm Pieck (Chairman of the SED - jointly with Otto Grotewohl, 1946–50, ; State President, 1949–60)
Otto Grotewohl (Chairman of the SED - jointly with Wilhelm Pieck, 1946–50; Chairman of the Council of Ministers, 1949–64)
Willi Stoph (Chairman of the Council of Ministers, 1964–73 and 1976–89; Chairman of the Council of State, 1973–76)
Egon Krenz (General Secretary of the SED, 1989; Chairman of the Council of State, 1989)
Hans Modrow, last socialist head of government
Lothar de Maizière, first (and only) non-socialist head of government
Günter Schabowski, famous for his role (as a government spokesman) in the fall of the Berlin Wall

Others
Erich Mielke
Wilhelm Külz
Günter Mittag
Robert Havemann
Gregor Gysi
Harry Tisch
Hermann Axen
Hilde Benjamin
Johannes R. Becher

See also
 History of the German Democratic Republic
 Communist state
 Leaders of East Germany
 National Front (East Germany)
 Soviet Military Administration in Germany
 Constitution of East Germany
 German Economic Commission
 German People's Congress
 German People's Council
 People's Control Commission
 People's Chamber
 List of Volkskammer members (9th election period)

Sources
 Library of Congress

References

External links
http://www.paper.olaf-freier.de/blockpt.htm